Gömöri trichrome stain is a histological stain used on muscle tissue.

It can be used to test for certain forms of mitochondrial myopathy.

It is named for George Gömöri, who developed it in 1950.

References

External links

Staining
1950 introductions